Letovicite is an ammonium sulfate mineral with composition (NH4)3H(SO4)2 (IUPAC: triammonium sulfate hydrogensulfate, Nickel–Strunz classification 07.AD.20).

It is a rare colorless or white monoclinic secondary mineral formed during the burning of waste coal heaps and as a deposit in hot springs. It was first described from the Letovice region of Moravia in 1932. Geologic occurrences also include Austria, Germany, Hungary, Italy, Poland, South Africa, Tajikistan and the United States.

References

Letovicite 
Letovicite Mineral Data 
Letovicite 
Letovicite

Bibliography
Palache, P.; Berman H.; Frondel, C. (1960). "Dana's System of Mineralogy, Volume II: Halides, Nitrates, Borates, Carbonates, Sulfates, Phosphates, Arsenates, Tungstates, Molybdates, Etc. (Seventh Edition)" John Wiley and Sons, Inc., New York, pp. 397.

Sulfate minerals
Ammonium minerals
Monoclinic minerals
Minerals in space group 15